× Phyllothamnus is a hybrid genus in the family Ericaceae with one known species, × Phyllothamnus erectus, an artificial hybrid between Phyllodoce empetriformis and Rhodothamnus chamaecistus, first described in 1850 as Bryanthus × erectus.

References

 
 Webster, A. D. Hardy Ornamental Flowering Trees and Shrubs

External links
 Image

Ericoideae
Monotypic Ericaceae genera
Plant nothogenera